Myriopteris chipinquensis is a fern endemic to Mexico, a member of the family Pteridaceae. One of the cheilanthoid ferns, it was classified in the genus Cheilanthes until 2013, when the genus Myriopteris was again recognized as separate from Cheilanthes. It grows in oak-pine forests of the Sierra Madre Oriental, often with the very similar and closely related Myriopteris tomentosa.

Description
The rhizome bears scales, which are linear-lanceolate with attenuate tips and entire (untoothed) margins.

The fronds spring up in clusters. The stipe (the stalk of the leaf, below the blade) represents about one-third to one-half of the total length of the leaf. The stipe is round and ungrooved in profile. It is brown in color and thickly covered with tan-colored hairs and narrow, linear scales.

The leaf blades are lanceolate, bipinnate (cut into pinnae and pinnules) to tripinnate-pinnatifid (cut into pinnae, pinnules, and lobed pinnulets). The leaf tissue is firm in texture, sometimes nearly leathery. The rachis (leaf axis) and costae (pinna axes) are covered in the same type of hairs and scales as the stipes. From 17 to 25 pairs of pinnae are present. The upper surface of the leaf bears a few crinkly white hairs; similar hairs, tan or white in color, are more abundant on the lower surface, although they do not completely conceal the leaf tissue of that surface.

On fertile fronds, the sori are protected by false indusia formed by the edge of the leaf curling back over the underside. The recurved edges are only a little modified in comparison to the rest of the leaf tissue, and are not divided into multiple segments. The sori contain tan to light brown spores, with 64 spores in each sporangium. The species is a diploid, with chromosome counts of 2n = 58 or 60.

M. chipinquensis is extremely similar to M. tomentosa, from which it was not distinguished until the 20th century, and is usually found growing with that species. M. tomentosa has a denser coating of hairs on both leaf surfaces, and its terminal and lateral subdivisions are more or less similar in shape. Its organs are in general slightly larger than those of M. chipinquensis. It also has 32, rather than 64, spores per sporangium.

Taxonomy
Myriopteris chipinquensis was first described by Irving W. Knobloch and David B. Lellinger in 1969 as Cheilanthes chipinquensis, based on material collected on Chipinque Mesa, in Nuevo León, by Knobloch on a trip with Paulino Rojas. It is quite similar to M. tomentosa, from which it can "scarcely be differentiated at a glance".

The development of molecular phylogenetic methods showed that the traditional circumscription of Cheilanthes is polyphyletic. Convergent evolution in arid environments is thought to be responsible for widespread homoplasy in the morphological characters traditionally used to classify it and the segregate genera that have sometimes been recognized. On the basis of molecular evidence, Amanda Grusz and Michael D. Windham revived the genus Myriopteris in 2013 for a group of species formerly placed in Cheilanthes. One of these was C. chipinquensis, which thus became Myriopteris chipinquensis. In 2018, Maarten J. M. Christenhusz transferred the species to Hemionitis as H. chipinquensis, as part of a program to consolidate the cheilanthoid ferns into that genus.

Further molecular studies in Myriopteris demonstrated the existence of three well-supported clades within the genus. M. chipinquensis belongs to what Grusz et al. informally named the covillei clade. It is most closely related to M. tomentosa, an asexual triploid, and is likely to be ancestral to that species. The two species, in turn, belong to a larger subclade which also includes M. jamaicensis, M. rufa, M. windhamii, and the more distantly related M. myriophylla.

Distribution and habitat
Myriopteris chipinquensis is endemic to Mexico, known from Nuevo León. It has also been reported from Coahuila, but without a cited voucher.

M. chipinquensis grows in oak-pine forests, either on soil or on limestone bedrock. on dry, rocky slopes over acidic bedrock, particularly basaltic rocks.

Notes and references

References

Works cited

External links
Image of the isotype of the species

chipinquensis
Ferns of Mexico
Plants described in 1969
Flora of Northeastern Mexico
Endemic flora of Mexico